Teh Faridah (born Teh Faridah Ahmed Norizan, 1959) is a Malaysian former actress and model as well as beauty pageant titleholder who was crowned Miss Malaysia Universe 1976. She represented Malaysia at the Miss Universe 1976 at Lee Theatre, Hong Kong.

In August 1976, Jelita magazine was established and Faridah was the first woman to be appeared on the cover of the magazine. Faridah was only 19-year-old at that time and was working as a Marketing Officer with Korean Airlines in Kuala Lumpur.

Filmography

References 

1959 births
Living people
Malaysian beauty pageant winners
Malaysian Muslims
Malaysian people of Malay descent
Miss Universe 1976 contestants
People from Perak